Khadija Mohammadou Saye (30 July 1992 – 14 June 2017), also known as Ya-Haddy Sisi Saye, was a Gambian-British photographer. Her photography explored her Gambian-British identity and was exhibited in the Diaspora Pavilion at the Venice Biennale in 2017. Saye died in the Grenfell Tower fire.

Life and work
Saye was born in London and initially attended the Sion Manning Roman Catholic Girls' School in North Kensington. At age 16 she won a scholarship to Rugby School in Rugby, England. Later she attended the University for the Creative Arts at Farnham and obtained a photography degree. She lived with her mother, Mary Ajaoi Augustus Mendy, on the 20th floor of Grenfell Tower in North Kensington. She was mentored by artist Nicola Green and became friends with Green's husband, Tottenham MP David Lammy.

Saye's photography explored her Gambian-British identity. Her series of photographs entitled Dwellings: in this Space we Breathe, based on Gambian spiritual practices, was exhibited in the Diaspora Pavilion at the 57th Venice Biennale from May to November 2017. Saye took part in a BBC TV documentary, Venice Biennale: Sink or Swim, that was scheduled for broadcast on 17 June. The programme "follows a team of diverse emerging artists as they install and prepare to launch the first ever Diaspora Pavilion in a Venetian palazzo during the Venice Biennale".

Saye was a passionate activist and educator, she volunteered at Jawaab to educate and empower young Muslims. She worked at PEER as a Creative Access intern from 2015 to 2016.

Death 
Both Saye and her mother died in the Grenfell Tower fire on 14 June 2017.

Legacy

The BBC TV programme on the Venice Biennale that included Saye was postponed after the fire and transmitted in September 2017.

Following her death, Tate Britain announced that it would exhibit a silkscreen of one of the pieces from the Dwellings series, Sothiou (2017), in the memorials section.

Her work was part of the reopening show of Kettle's Yard in Cambridge on 10 February 2018.

In 2018 Saye's works were auctioned at Christie's as part of the Post-War and Contemporary Day Auction. Nak Bejjen, one of the tintypes from the series Dwelling: in this space we breath was sold for £43,750.

Between 2 October and 2 November 2019 a portfolio of nine silkscreen prints, titled In this space we breathe were exhibited at Victoria Miro Gallery. This was part of Rock My Soul, an exhibition of black female artists curated by the artist Isaac Julien.

In 2019, the London Transport Museum launched a photography fellowship program in Saye's name.

A paid internship at PEER has been set up in Saye's name for young BAME artists.

In July 2020 Khadija Saye Arts was launched at IntoUniversity. The programme addresses the issue of BAME inclusivity in the creative industries by focusing directly on the barriers that exist to young people from disadvantaged communities. It provides support and mentoring to help young people to explore the Arts. The launch of the Khadija Saye Arts coincided with the unveiling of Breath is Invisible, Nine large-scale prints of Saye's series in this space we breath were displayed across the outside façade of 236 Westbourne Grove in West London. This was the first of three exhibitions to run at the space, all of which aim to explore social inequality and injustice.

Between 23 October 2020 and 1 August 2021 Saye's tin-type, Peitaw, was exhibited at the British Library as part of the exhibition Unfinished Business: The Fight for Women's Rights. Concurrently and still showing is Saye's portfolio of nine silkscreen prints, In this space we breathe, in the Entrance Hall Gallery of the British Library (3 December 2020 – 7 October 2021).

Exhibitions 

 Discerning Eye, Mall Galleries, London, 2014
 Diaspora Pavilion, Venice Biennale, Palazzo Pisani S Marina, Venice, Italy, 2017
 Tate Modern, London, 2017
 Actions, Kettle's Yard, Cambridge, 2018
 in this space we breathe, British Library, London, 2020/21
 Unfinished Business: The Fight for Women's Rights, British Library, London, 2020/21

References

External links

BBC Three programme about Saye including an interview (video)

1992 births
2017 deaths
People from Hammersmith
Deaths from fire
Black British photographers
English people of Gambian descent
English women photographers
Photographers from London
21st-century British photographers
21st-century British women artists
21st-century women photographers